Jorge Penna was a Brazilian football manager.

Coaching career
The first mention of Penna's foray into international football management came when he was appointed manager of the Jamaica national football team in 1962. He appears to have had a brief stint as manager of the Nigeria national football team between 1963 and 1964, before a return to Jamaica for 1966 FIFA World Cup qualification games in 1965.

After another short stint as manager of Nigeria, it is not clear what happened to Penna, though it is believed he since died.

References

Date of birth unknown
Date of death unknown
Brazilian football managers
Jamaica national football team managers
Nigeria national football team managers
Brazilian expatriate football managers
Brazilian expatriate sportspeople in Jamaica
Expatriate football managers in Jamaica
Expatriate football managers in Nigeria